South Korea women's junior national softball team is the junior national under-17 team for South Korea. The team competed at the 1991 ISF Junior Women's World Championship in Adelaide, Australia where they had 3 wins and 8 losses.  The team competed at the 1995 ISF Junior Women's World Championship in Normal, Illinois where they finished eleventh.  The team competed at the 1999 ISF Junior Women's World Championship in Taipei, Taiwan where they finished fourteenth.  The team competed at the 2003 ISF Junior Women's World Championship in Nanjing, China where they finished thirteenth. The team competed at the 2013 ISF Junior Women's World Championship in Brampton, Ontario where they finished eleventh.

References

External links 
 International Softball Federation

Women's national under-18 softball teams
Softball in South Korea
Youth sport in South Korea
Softball